Maruina lanceolata is a species of moth flies in the family Psychodidae.

References

Psychodidae
Diptera of North America
Insects described in 1899
Articles created by Qbugbot
Taxa named by Trevor Kincaid